The Old University of Leuven (or of Louvain) is the name historians give to the university, or studium generale, founded in Leuven, Brabant (then part of the Burgundian Netherlands, now part of Belgium), in 1425. The university was closed in 1797, a week after the cession to the French Republic of the Austrian Netherlands and the principality of Liège (jointly the future Belgium) by the Treaty of Campo Formio.

The name was in medieval Latin Studium generale Lovaniense or Universitas Studii Lovaniensis, in humanistical Latin Academia Lovaniensis, and most usually, Universitas Lovaniensis, in Dutch Universiteyt Loven and also Hooge School van Loven.

It is commonly referred to as the University of Leuven or University of Louvain, sometimes with the qualification "old" to distinguish it from the Catholic University of Leuven (established 1835 in Leuven). This might also refer to a short-lived but historically important State University of Leuven, 1817–1835.

History
In the 15th century the civil administration of the town of Leuven, with the support of John IV, Duke of Brabant, a prince of the House of Valois, made a formal request to the Holy See for a university.

Pope Martin V issued a papal bull dated 9 December 1425 founding the University in Leuven as a Studium Generale. This university was institutionally independent of the local ecclesiastical hierarchy.

From the founding of the university to its abolition in 1797, Latin was the sole language of instruction.

In its early years, this university was modelled on those of Paris, Cologne and Vienna.  The university flourished in the 16th century due to the presence of famous scholars and professors, such as Adriaan Florenszoon Boeyens (Pope Adrian VI), Desiderius Erasmus, Johannes Molanus, Joan Lluís Vives, Andreas Vesalius and Gerardus Mercator.

In 1519, the Faculty of Theology of Leuven, jointly with that of the University of Cologne, became the first institution to condemn a number of statements drawn from Martin Luther's Ninety-five Theses (preceding the papal bull Exsurge Domine by several months).

After the French Revolutionary Wars, by the Treaty of Campo Formio signed on 17 October 1797, the Austrian Netherlands ware ceded in perpetuity to the French Republic by the Holy Roman Emperor Francis II, in exchange for the Republic of Venice. Once formally integrated into the French Republic, a law dating to 1793 mandating that all universities in France be closed came into effect. The University of Leuven was abolished by decree of the Département of the Dyle on October 25, 1797.

What remained of the university's movables and books were requisitioned for the École centrale in Brussels. This was the immediate official and legal successor and inheritor of the old University, under the laws in force at the time. It was in turn closed down in 1802.

Cultural role and influence 
During the seventeenth and eighteenth centuries, the University of Leuven was until its closure a great centre of Jansenism in Europe. To shake off this reputation, the faculty of theology thrice declared its adherence to the papal condemnation of Jansenist beliefs in the papal bull Unigenitus (1713) but without effect.
The University of Louvain, with Baïus and Jansenius, the cradle of Jansenism and remained, during the 17th and 18th centuries until its closure, the bastion and the hub of Augustinian theology known as Jansenism, in Europe, with professors like Jansenius, Petrus Stockmans, Johannes van Neercassel, Josse Le Plat and especially the famous Van Espen and his disciple Febronius, and as Henri Francotte says: “Jansenism reigned supreme at the University of Louvain”.

This fidelity to the spirit of Van Espen remained alive in the University of Louvain until its abolition in 1797, as evidenced by what Charles Lambrechts wrote in 1818, former rector magnificus and successor to the chair of canon law of Van Espen : “The encroachments of the Catholic clergy and their claims were so vexatious that, at a time when their religion was dominant, no other remedy had been found for their abuse of power except the appeals in question. This is what prompted the famous Van Espen to write, at the age of eighty, his treatise De recursu ad principem, in order to put a barrier against the ever-recurring abuses of clerical jurisdictions; but this virtuous ecclesiastic, who distributed to the poor all the revenues of the chair of canon law which he occupied at the University of Louvain, was soon obliged to have recourse to appeal as an abuse for himself; still, this remedy could not save him entirely from the persecution of intolerant priests. Loaded with years, glory and infirmities, he was compelled to seek shelter in Holland from their vexations; he soon died in Amsterdam in feelings of piety and resignation, after having employed his life in defending the discipline and customs of the primitive church, of which he was the most zealous supporter ".

Subsequent institutions
The first attempt to found a successor university in the nineteenth-century was the secular State University of Leuven, 1817–1835, where a dozen professors of the old University taught. This was followed by a private Catholic university, the Catholic University of Leuven, established in Leuven in 1835 (initially the Catholic University of Mechlin, 1834–1835). This institution was founded with the intention of restoring the confessionally Catholic pre-Revolutionary traditions of learning in Leuven. In 1968 this split to form the two current institutions: the Dutch language Katholieke Universiteit Leuven and the French language Université catholique de Louvain.

Library

From the founding of the university in 1425 up until 1636, there was no official library of the university. Very likely the students had access to manuscripts and printed books preserved in the homes of their professors or colleges.

In 1636, however, a university library was founded in the Cloth hall, previously the seat of the cloth weavers’ guild, and was enlarged in 1725 in a baroque style.

This library, with its various additions, was transferred in 1797 by M. De la Serna Santander to the École centrale official continuation of the old university. Wauthier, head of office of the department of Dyle and the ex-Jesuit De la Serna Santander, librarian of the Central School of Brussels, were responsible for the application of this measure. On October 26, 1797, they went with Michel-Marcel Robyns, receiver of national domains, to the municipal administration of Louvain, to notify it, while its most precious works and manuscripts were deposited in Paris among the national treasures of the National Library.

It is also very likely that on the occasion of the troubles of the wars of this time, many precious works and documents surreptitiously followed an unofficial route, sometimes with the high aim of saving them from disaster, sometimes with the sordid goal to profit from it.

In 1797, much of what remained of this library was sent to the École centrale de Bruxelles, established as the official replacement of the abolished university, although its most precious books and manuscripts were deposited in Paris at the Bibliothèque nationale de France. The library of the Central School of Brussels came to number about 80,000 volumes, which later became part of the Library of Brussels, and then the Royal Library of Belgium.

When invading German forces burned the library of the Catholic University of Leuven at the beginning of the First World War, but this library did not contain the books and archives of the old university, or of the State University, but only those of the 19th-century founded  Catholic University of Leuven.

Archives 
The rich archives of the old University of Leuven, after its suppression by the law of the French Republic, so as all the other Universities of the French Republic, were transferred to a "Commission in charge of the management of the goods of the abolished university in Leuven", set up in 1797 and active until 1813. They passed to the National Archives of the United Kingdom of the Netherlands and ultimately to the National Archives of Belgium.

Although the archives of the old University of Leuven have been recognized as world heritage by UNESCO, until today there is no complete history of the old University of Leuven.

List of colleges 

Chronological list of colleges by foundation, the oldest 4 (Castle/Pork/Lely and Faulcon) were considered as Grand College. in the early 18th century there were 18 colleges.

Related people

List of chancellors
Chronological list of chancellors.

Notable professors in chronological order 

 Michael Baius (1513–1589), theologian, inspirer of the Baianism.
 Petrus Peckius the Younger (1562–1625), diplomat and chancellor of Brabant
 Grégoire de Saint-Vincent (1584-1667), mathematician
 Cornelius Jansen (1585-1638), inspirer of Jansenism.
 Petrus Stockmans (1608-1671), Hellenist and jurisconsult, important member of Jansenism.
 Christian Lupus (1612-1681), jansenist theologian.
 Zeger Bernhard van Espen (1646-1728), canonist, jansenist theologian..
 Martin van Velden (1664-1724), philosopher.
 John Sullivan (1633-1699), rector of the University of Louvain(1690-1691), president of Irish Pastoral College(1672-1697), president of the College de Drieux, Louvain(1692-95).
He returned to President of the Irish Pastoral College 1695.
 Josse Le Plat (1732-1810), jurisconsult and professor of canon law, supporter of Josephinism and Enlightenment.
 Martin Fery (1754-1809), professor of philosophy, became representative of the people in the Council of the Five Hundred in 1797. He was a Freemason.
 Charles Joseph van der Stegen, Freemason, member of the lodge the True Friends of the Union.
 Jean-Pierre Minckelers (1748-1824), inventor of lighting gas.
 Guillaume van Cutsem (1749-1825) jurisconsult, deputy of the departement of the Deux-Nèthes and adviser to the Imperial Court of Justice in 1811.
 Charles Lambrechts (1753-1825), professor of canon law (1777), rector of the university (1786) and freemason, member of the lodge of the True and Perfect Harmony in Mons, became Minister of Justice of the French Republic from 3 vendémiaire year VI to 2 thermidor year VII.
 Ferdinand Sentelet (1754-1829), graduate in theology, professor of philosophy at the Pedagogy of the Lily and president of the college of Craenendonck, since 1780. Then becomes professor of physics and rural economy at the new State University of Louvain, member of the Netherlands Institute.
 Jean-Baptiste Liebaert, professor of philosophy, after the abolition of the university in 1797 he will continue his course as a private professor and will then become a professor at the State University of Louvain.
 Étienne Heuschling (1762-1847), professor of Hebrew at the Collegium Trilingue, orientalist and philologist, then became a professor at the State University of Louvain.
 Jean Philippe Debruyn (1766-), then became a professor at the State University of Louvain.
 Xavier Jacquelart (1767-1856), jurisconsult, professor at the Faculty of Law, he became in 1797 professor at the Law School of the Imperial University in Brussels and then professor at the law faculty of the State University of Louvain

Notable alumni 

 Rudolph of Beringen (active 1420–1459), professor of canon law
 Jan Standonck (1454–1504), Master of the Collège de Montaigu in Paris
 Adriaan Floriszoon Boeyens (1459–1523), Pope Adrian VI
 Desiderius Erasmus (1466–1536), humanist
 Damião de Góis (1502-1574), Portuguese humanist,  philosopher 
 Johannes Sturm (1507–1589), German educator
 Gerard Mercator (1512–1594), cartographer
 Andreas Vesalius (1514–1564), father of modern anatomy
 Rembert Dodoens (1517–1585), botanist
 Antoine Perrenot de Granvelle (1517–1586), cardinal, statesman
 Wilhelmus Damasi Lindanus (1525–1588), Bishop of Roermond and Gent, author
 John Dee (1527–1608 or 9), mathematician, astronomer, astrologer, occult philosopher, imperialist and adviser to Queen Elizabeth I
 Petrus Peckius the Elder (1529–1589), law professor
 Blessed Diarmaid Ó hUrthuile, or Dermot O'Hurley (c. 1530–1584), Archbishop of Cashel, Roman Catholic martyr
 Willem Hessels van Est (1542–1613), biblical scholar
 Justus Lipsius (1547–1606), philologist
 Leonardus Lessius (1554–1623), Jesuit moral theologian
 Petrus Peckius the Younger (1562–1625), diplomat and chancellor of Brabant
 Aubert Miraeus (1573–1640), ecclesiastical historian
 Jacobus Boonen (1573–1655), Archbishop of Mechelen
 Adriaan van den Spiegel (1578–1625), anatomist and botanist
 Lawrence Beyerlinck (1578–1627), encyclopedist
 Nicolaus Vernulaeus (1583–1649), Latin playwright
 Abbé de Saint-Cyran (1583–1643), French ecclesiastic
 Cornelius Otto Jansen (1585–1638), father of Jansenism
 St Robert Bellarmine (1569–1576), Cardinal, Jesuit theologian.
 John of St. Thomas (1589–1644), theologian and philosopher
 John Sinnich (1603-1666), Irish born, professor of theology
 Marcin Kalinowski (c. 1605–1652), Polish nobleman
 Łukasz Opaliński (1612–1666), political writer
 Franciscus Deurweerders (c. 1616–1666), founder of the Confraternity of the Cord of Saint Thomas
 René-François de Sluse (1622-1685), mathematician
 Cornelis de Bie (1627 – c.1715), Flemish rhetorician
 Joannes Roucourt (1636–1676), parish priest and theologian
 Francis Martin (1652–1722), Irish controversialist
 Edward Ambrose Burgis (c.1673-1747), historian and theologian
 Febronius (1701–1790), historian and theologian
 Henri-Jacques Le Grelle (1753-1826), politician, one of three authors of the 1790 Belgian Constitution.
 Charles Nerinckx (1761–1824), founder of the Sisters of Loretto
 Jean-Baptiste van Dievoet (1775-1862), Licentiatus in both laws

See also

 Academic libraries in Leuven
 Catholic University of Leuven
 Catholic University of Mechelen
 Collegium Trilingue
 Faculty of Theology, Old University of Leuven
 Katholieke Universiteit Leuven
 List of colleges of Leuven University
 List of medieval universities
 State University of Leuven
 Université catholique de Louvain
 Louvain-la-Neuve
 Universities in Leuven

Notes

Bibliography
 1627: Nicolaus Vernulaeus, Academia Lovaniensis. Ejus origo, incrementum, viri illustres, res gestae, Louvain, 1627.
 1635: Valerius Andreas, Fasti academici Lovanienses, Louvain, edited by Jean Olivier et Corneille Coenesteyn, 1635.
 1829: Baron Frédéric de Reiffenberg, Mémoires sur les deux premiers siècles de l'Université de Louvain, Brussels, 1829-35.
 1838: P. De Ram, Laforêt et Namêche, "Analectes pour servir à l'histoire de l'Université de Louvain", in, Annuaire de l'Université de Louvain, 1838-65.
 1856: F. Nève. Mémoire historique et littéraire sur le collège des Trois-langues à l'Université de Louvain, Brussels, 1856.
 1881: Edmond Reusens, Documents relatifs à l'histoire de l'Université de Louvain (1425-1797), in Analectes pour servir à l'histoire ecclésiastique, t. XVII and sequents, 1881-92.
 1881: P. De Ram, Codex veterum statutorum Academiae Lovaniensis, Brussels, 1881.
 1884: Arthur Verhaeghen, Les cinquante dernières années de l'ancienne Université de Louvain, Liège, 1884.
 1945: Léon van der Essen, L'université de Louvain, Brussels, 1945.
 F. Claeys Boúúaert, L'Ancienne Université de Louvain, Études et Documents, Louvain 1956.
 1959: F. Claeys Boúúaert, Contribution à l'histoire économique de l'Ancienne Université de Louvain,1959.
 1977: Claude Bruneel, Répertoire des thèses de l'Ancienne Université, Louvain,1977.
 1990: Emiel Lamberts et Jan Roegiers, Leuven University, 1425-1985, Louvain, University Press, 1990.
 1990: Jan Roegiers, "Was de oude Universiteit Leuven een Rijksuniversiteit? ", in Archief-en bibliotheekwezen in België, 1990, p. 545.
 2007: Toon Quaghebeur, "Quelques caractéristiques de la querelle entre l’Université de Louvain et le Saint-Office sur le Jansénisme louvaniste du XVIIe siècle", in: Controverse et polémiques religieuses. Antiquité-Temps Modernes, Paris,  l’Harmattan, 2007, p. 87-96.

External links

Online exhibition of the university's history
Scholars and Literati at the Universitas Lovaniensis (1425–1797), Repertorium Eruditorum Totius Europae – RETE

 

de:Geschichte der Universität Löwen